George Ralph Mrkonic (born December 17, 1929 in McKeesport, Pennsylvania) is a former American football offensive tackle in the National Football League for the Philadelphia Eagles.  He also played in the Canadian Football League for the BC Lions.

College career
Mrkonic played college football at the University of Kansas from 1950 to 1952.  During that period, the Jayhawks had a 21-9 record.  They finished 8-2 in 1951, the year he was selected as an All-American.  Mrkonic was selected on the all-conference team in 1950 and 1951.  He was also the punter for the Jayhawks, and led Kansas in punting stats in 1951.

Professional career
Mrkonic was drafted in the fourth round (45th overall) in the 1953 NFL Draft by the Philadelphia Eagles and played ten games with them that season.  In 1956, he tried the Canadian Football League, playing only one game with the BC Lions. He later retired and moved to Shawnee Mission Kansas, where he lived with his wife Ruth. He had six grandchildren.

Death
Mrkonic died in Kansas City, Kansas, the week of May 22, 2011 after a lengthy battle with cancer.

References

1929 births
American football offensive tackles
Sportspeople from McKeesport, Pennsylvania
BC Lions players
Philadelphia Eagles players
Kansas Jayhawks football players
American people of Serbian descent
2011 deaths
Players of American football from Pennsylvania